The Trial is a 2010 drama film directed by Gary Wheeler and starring Matthew Modine. It is based on the novel of the same name by Robert Whitlow and was released September 10, 2010, grossing $19,753 at the box office.

Plot 
Kent "Mac" McClain, after losing his wife and kids in a car crash, experiences grief of the loss and attempts suicide with a revolver. However, he is interrupted by a phone call inviting him to solve a case involving a murder called the Hightower murder case. He discusses it with Judge Danielson, who encourages him to start living. Mac then talks to Pete Thomason, the supposed murderer of his girlfriend by strangulation. However, Pete does not remember the situation.

Then, seeking guidance, Mac invites two other friends, his neighbor Ray, and a friend Mindy to help him investigate the murder. They both discuss the idea that Pete doesn't remember anything, and try to find evidence that is possibly important to the trial.

Cast
 Matthew Modine as Mac
 Robert Forster as Ray
 Clare Carey as Dr. Anna Wilkes
 Bob Gunton as Joe Whetstone
 Randy Wayne as Pete Thomason
 Rance Howard as Judge Danielson
 Nikki DeLoach as Mindy
 Burgess Jenkins as Harry
 Larry Bagby as Spencer Hightower

Production
Filming took place in Monroe, North Carolina.

References

 
 

2010 drama films
2010 films
Films about lawyers
2010s legal films
Films shot in North Carolina
American legal films
American drama films
2010s English-language films
2010s American films